Guilherme Biro may refer to:

Guilherme Biro (footballer, born 2000), Brazilian football midfielder
Guilherme Biro (footballer, born 2004), Brazilian football defender